Essaouira (formerly  Amegdul), known until the 1960s as Mogador, is a port city in the western Moroccan region of Marakesh-Safi, on the Atlantic coast. It has 77,966 inhabitants as of 2014.

The foundation of the city of Essaouira was the work of the Moroccan 'Alawid sultan Mohammed bin Abdallah, who made an original experiment by entrusting it to several renowned architects in 1760, in particular Théodore Cornut and Ahmed al-Inglizi, who designed the city using French captives from the failed French expedition to Larache in 1765, and with the mission of building a city adapted to the needs of foreign merchants. Once built, it continued to grow and experienced a golden age and exceptional development, becoming the country's most important commercial port but also its diplomatic capital between the end of the 18th century and the first half of the 19th century.

Name and etymology 
Both spellings represent its name in Moroccan Arabic, ṣ-Ṣwiṛa. This is the diminutive (with definite article) of the noun ṣuṛ which means "wall (as round a yard, city), rampart". The pronunciation with pharyngealized /ṣ/ and /ṛ/ is a typically Moroccan development. In Classical Arabic, the noun is sūr (with plain /s/ and /r/), diminutive suwayrah; this is the only form cited in all dictionaries of Classical Arabic. Hence, the spelling of the name in Arabic script according to the classical pronunciation is  al-Suwayrah (with sīn not ṣād).

In the Berber language, which is spoken by a sizeable proportion of the city's inhabitants, it is called Taṣṣort, meaning "the small fortress".

In Moroccan Arabic, a single male inhabitant is called ṣwiṛi, plural ṣwiṛiyin, a single female inhabitant is ṣwiṛiya, plural ṣwiṛiyat. In the Berber language, a single male inhabitant is u Taṣṣort, plural: ayt Taṣṣoṛt, a single female inhabitant is ult Taṣṣort, plural ist Taṣṣort.

Until the 1960s, Essaouira was generally known by its Portuguese name, Mogador. This name is probably a corruption of the older Berber name Amegdul (spelled  in Arabic), which is mentioned by the 11th-century geographer al-Bakrī.

History
Archaeological research shows that Essaouira has been occupied since prehistoric times. The bay at Essaouira is partially sheltered by the island of Mogador, making it a peaceful harbor protected against strong marine winds.

Antiquity
Essaouira has long been considered one of the best anchorages of the Moroccan coast. The Carthaginian navigator Hanno visited in the 5th century BC and established the trading post of Arambys.

Around the end of the 1st century BCE or early 1st century CE, the Berber king Juba II established a Tyrian purple factory, processing the murex and purpura shells found in the intertidal rocks at Essaouira and the Iles Purpuraires. This dye colored the purple stripe in the togas worn by the Senators of Imperial Rome.

A Roman villa was excavated on Mogador island. A Roman vase was found as well as coinage from the 3rd century CE. Most of the artifacts are now visible in the Sidi Mohammed ben Abdallah Museum and the Rabat Archaeological Museum.

Early modern period

During the Middle Ages, a Muslim saint named Sidi Mogdoul was buried in Essaouira, probably giving its origin to the name "Mogador".

Portuguese establishment (1506–1510)

In 1506, the king of Portugal, D. Manuel I, ordered a fortress to be built there, named Castelo Real de Mogador. Altogether, the Portuguese are documented to have seized six Moroccan towns and built six stand-alone fortresses on the Moroccan Atlantic coast, between the river Loukos in the north and the river of Sous in the south. Four of them only had a short duration: Graciosa (1489), São João da Mamora (1515), Castelo Real of Mogador (1506–10) and Aguz (1520–25). Two became permanent urban settlements: Santa Cruz do Cabo de Gué (modern Agadir, founded in 1505–06), and Mazagan, founded in 1514–17. Following the 1541 Fall of Agadir, the Portuguese had to abandon most of their settlements between 1541 and 1550, although they were able to keep Ceuta, Tangier and Mazagan.

The fortress of Castelo Real of Mogador fell to the local resistance of the Regraga fraternity four years after its establishment, in 1510.

During the 16th century, powers including Spain, England, the Netherlands and France tried in vain to conquer the locality. Essaouira remained a haven for the export of sugar and molasses and as an anchorage for pirates.

De Razilly expedition (1629)

France was involved in an early attempt to colonize Mogador in 1629. As Richelieu and Père Joseph were attempting to establish a colonial policy, Admiral Isaac de Razilly suggested they occupy Mogador in 1626, which he had reconnoitered in 1619. The objective was to create a base against the Sultan of Morocco and asphyxiate the harbour of Safi.

He departed for Salé on 20 July 1629 with a fleet composed of the ships Licorne, Saint-Louis, Griffon, Catherine, Hambourg, Sainte-Anne, Saint-Jean. He bombarded the city of Salé, destroyed three corsair ships, and then sent the Griffon under Captain Treillebois to Mogador. The men of Razilly saw the fortress of Castelo Real in Mogador and landed 100 men with wood and supplies on Mogador island, with the agreement of Richelieu. After a few days, however, the Griffon reembarked the colonists and departed to rejoin the fleet in Salé.

After these expeditions, France signed a treaty with Abd el-Malek II in 1631, giving France preferential treatment, known as "capitulations": preferential tariffs, the establishment of a Consulate, and freedom of religion for French subjects.

Foundation of modern Essaouira (1760–1770)

The present city of Essaouira was built during the mid-eighteenth century by the Moroccan King. Mohammed III tried to reorient his kingdom toward the Atlantic for increased exchanges with European powers, choosing Mogador as his key location. One of his objectives was to establish a harbour at the closest possible point to Marrakesh. The other was to cut off trade from Agadir in the south, which had been favouring a political rival of Mohammed III, and the inhabitants of Agadir were forced to relocate to Essaouira.

For 12 years, Mohammed III directed a French engineer, Théodore Cornut, and several other Moroccan and European architects and technicians to build the fortress and city along modern lines. Originally called "Souira" ("the small fortress"), the name became "Es-Saouira" ("the beautifully designed").

Thédore Cornut designed and built the city itself, particularly the Kasbah area, corresponding to the royal quarters and the buildings for Christian merchants and diplomats. Other parts were built by other architects, including Moroccan architects especially from Fez, Marrakesh, and Rabat. The harbour entrance, with the "Porte de la Marine", was built by an English renegade by the name of Ahmed el Inglizi ("Ahmed the English") or Ahmed El Alj ("Ahmed the Renegade"). Mohammed III took numerous steps to encourage the development of Essaouira including closing off the harbour of Agadir to the south in 1767 so that southern trade could be redirected through Essaouira. European communities in the northern harbour of Rabat-Salé were ordered to move to Essaouira through an ordinance of 21 January 1765.

From the time of its rebuilding by Muhammad III until the end of the nineteenth century, Essaouira served as Morocco's principal port, offering the goods of the caravan trade to the world. The route brought goods from sub-Saharan Africa to Timbuktu, then through the desert and over the Atlas mountains to Marrakesh. The road from Marrakesh to Essaouira is a straight line, explaining the king's choice of this port among the many others along the Moroccan coast.

Jewish presence

Mohammed III encouraged Moroccan Jews to settle in the town and handle the trade with Europe. Jews once comprised the majority of the population, and the Jewish quarter (or mellah) contains many old synagogues. The town also has a large Jewish cemetery. The city flourished until the caravan trade died, superseded by direct European shipping trade with sub-Saharan Africa. Changes in trade, the founding of Israel, the resulting wars with Arab states, and the independence of Morocco all resulted in Sephardic Jews leaving the country. As of 2017, Essaouira had only three Jewish inhabitants. On 15 January 2020, King Mohammed VI visited Bayt Dakira, a Jewish heritage house, in Essaouira.

European trade and diplomacy

In the 19th century, Essaouira became the first seaport of Morocco, with trade volumes about double those of Rabat. The city functioned as the harbour for Marrakesh, as it was only a few days from the inland city. Diplomatic and trade representations were established by European powers in Essouira. In the 1820s, European diplomats were concentrated in either Tangier or Essaouira.

French interventions and Protectorate

Following Morocco's alliance with Algeria's Abd-El-Kader against France, Essaouira was bombarded and briefly occupied by the French Navy under the Prince de Joinville on 16 August 1844, in the Bombardment of Mogador, an important battle of the First Franco-Moroccan War.

From 1912 to 1956, Essaouira was part of the French protectorate of Morocco. Mogador was used as a base for a military expedition against Dar Anflous, when 8,000 French troops were located outside the city under the orders of Generals Franchet d'Esperey and Brulard. The Kasbah of Dar Anflous was taken on 25 January 1913. In 1930, brothers, Michel and Jean Vieuchange used Essaouira as a base before Michel set off into the Western Sahara to try to find Smara.

France had an important administrative, military and economic presence. Essaouira had a Franco-Moroccan school, still visible in Derb Dharb street. Linguistically, many Moroccans of Essaouira speak French fluently today.

Recent years

In the early 1950s film director and actor Orson Welles stayed at the Hotel des Iles just south of the town walls during the filming of his 1952 classic version of "Othello" which contains several memorable scenes shot in the labyrinthine streets and alleyways of the medina.  Legend has it that during Welles' sojourn in the town he met Winston Churchill, another guest at the Hotel des Iles. A bas-relief of Orson Welles is located in a small square just outside the medina walls close to the sea. Several other film directors have utilized Essaouira as a location due to the photogenic and atmospheric qualities.

The town was used in the filming of "The Game of Thrones" as the home of the Army of the Unsullied.  The scene of the rows of crucified slaves were props to cover the Portuguese cannons.

Beginning in the late 1960s, Essaouira became something of a hippie hangout.

Geography

Essaouira is protected by a natural bay partially shielded from wave action by the Iles Purpuraires.  A broad sandy beach extends from the harbour south of Essaourira, at which point the Oued Ksob discharges to the ocean; south of the discharge lies the archaeological ruin, the Bordj El Berod. The Canary Current is responsible for the generally southward movement of ocean circulation and has led to enhancement of the local fishery. The village of Diabat lies about five kilometres south of Essaouira, immediately south of the Oued Ksob.

Essaouira connects to Safi to the north and to Agadir to the south via the N1 road and to Marrakech to the east via the R 207 road.

Climate
Essaouira's climate is semi-arid (BSk/BSh) with mild temperatures year round. The gap between highs and lows is small and summers are warm while winters are mild. Annual rainfall is usually .

Essaouira today

The Medina of Essaouira (formerly "Mogador") is a UNESCO World Heritage listed city, an example of a late 18th-century fortified town, as transferred to North Africa by European colonists.

Accommodation
There are only a handful of modern purpose-built hotels within the walls of the old city.  Newer international hotels have been built along the sea front, with local planning regulations restricting buildings to 4 storeys in height. There are also many privately owned riads, also known as dars, that may be rented on a daily or weekly basis.

Activities

The medina is home to many small arts and crafts businesses, notably cabinet making and 'thuya' wood-carving (using roots of the Tetraclinis tree), both of which have been practised in Essaouira for centuries.

The fishing harbour, suffering from the competition of Agadir and Safi remains rather small, although the catches (sardines, conger eels) are surprisingly abundant due to the coastal upwelling generated by the powerful trade winds and the Canaries Current. Essaouira remains one of the major fishing harbours of Morocco. 

Essaouira is also renowned for its kitesurfing and windsurfing, with the powerful trade wind blowing almost constantly onto the protected, almost waveless, bay. Several world-class clubs rent top-notch material on a weekly basis. The township of Sidi Kaouki is located 25 km south of Essaouira and is becoming one of the best locations in Morocco for surfing, windsurfing and kitesurfing. There are several businesses in Sidi Kaouki which offer gear rental.

Essaouira is also a center of argan oil production. It has become a tourist attraction due to the tree-climbing goats who are unique to the region, as argan trees are the only type the goats climb.

Education

There is a French international school in Essaouira, Groupe scolaire Eric-Tabarly.

Culture

Essaouira presents itself as a city full of culture: several small art galleries are found all over the town. Since 1998, the Gnaoua Festival of World Music is held in Essaouira, normally in the last week of June. It brings together artists from all over the world.  Although focused on gnaoua music, it includes rock, jazz and reggae. Dubbed as the "Moroccan Woodstock" it lasts four days and attracts annually around 450,000 spectators.

Sights 
Jewish quarter "Mellah" of Essaouira's old medina
Bayt Dakira - "House of Memory" (Jewish museum)
Chaim Pinto Synagogue
Jewish cemeteries of Essaouira (old and new)
Gravesite of the Great Rabbi Haim Pinto (and many more rabbis)
 Medina
 Fortifications:
 Sqala du Port
 Sqala de la Kasbah
 The most picturesque gates:
 Port de la Marine
 Bab Manjana with clocktower
 Tagart beach (with sand dunes)
 Notre-Dame-de-l’Assomption church (catholic, operational)
 Sidi Mogdoul mosque
 Sidi Mogdoul lighthouse
 Ben Youssef mosque

International relations

Essaouira is twinned with:
 Changshu, China
 La Rochelle, France

Notable people
Albert Almoznino, hand shadow artist
Jacques Amir, politician
Rabbi David Hanania Pinto, founder of Chevrat Pinto and Orot Haim VeMoshe Institutions, and grandson of the Tzadik Rabbi Haim Pinto
André Azoulay, adviser to the King
David Bensoussan, author of memoir Le fils de Mogador
Meir Cohen, politician
Victor Elmaleh, businessman and national champion handball and squash player.
Edmond Amran El Maleh, writer

See also
Haha
Regraga
Tensift River
Souira Guedima
Gnaoua World Music Festival
Gnaoua
André Jodin
William Willshire

Notes

Further reading 
 David Bensoussan & Asher Knafo, "Mariage juif à Mogador" Éditions Du Lys, www.editionsdulys.ca, Montréal, 2004
 David Bensoussan, Le fils de Mogador, www.editionsdulys.ca,Éditions Du Lys, Montréal, 2002
 David Bensoussan, Il était une fois le Maroc : témoignages du passé judéo-marocain, éd. du Lys, www.editionsdulys.ca, Montréal, 2010; Deuxième édition :  www.iuniverse.com, 620p. ebook , Prix Haïm Zafrani de l'Institut universitaire Élie Wiesel, Paris 2012.
 David Bensoussan, La rosace du roi Salomon, Les Éditions Du Lys,www.editionsdulys.ca, 2011, .
 Hamza Ben Driss Ottmani, Une cité sous les alizés, MOGADOR, Des origines à 1939, Éditions La Porte, Rabat, 1997 
 Jean-Marie Thiébaud, Consuls et vice-consuls de France à Mogador (Maroc), L'Harmattan, 2010 Harmattan.fr
 Jean-Marie Thiébaud, Les Inscriptions du cimetière [chrétien] de Mogador (Essaouira, Maroc) – étude épigraphique et généalogique, L'Harmattan, 2010 Harmattan.fr
 Doris Byer: Essaouira, endlich, Wien 2004,  
 Brigitte Tast, Hans-Juergen Tast: Still the wind cries Jimi. Hendrix in Marokko, Schellerten 2012, 
 Brigitte Tast, Hans-Jürgen Tast: Orson Welles – Othello – Mogador. Aufenthalte in Essaouira, Kulleraugen Vis.Komm. Nr. 42, Schellerten 2013,

External links

UNESCO World Heritage site: Medina of Essaouira (formerly Mogador)
Website of the Urban Agency of Essaouira

 
Cities in Morocco
Former Portuguese colonies
Kingdom of the Algarve
Phoenician colonies in Morocco
Populated places in Essaouira Province
Port cities and towns on the Moroccan Atlantic Coast
Essaouira
World Heritage Sites in Morocco